Bowhill is a locality in South Australia. A settlement is located inside a bend on the left (eastern/southern) bank of the Murray River between Mannum and Swan Reach. It is predominantly shacks built facing the river bank. The settlement is in the Mid Murray Council area, but most of the locality is located away from the river and within in the District Council of Karoonda East Murray, including the Lowan Conservation Park.

Bowhill is located in the local government area of District Council of Karoonda East Murray, the state electoral district of Hammond and the federal Division of Barker.

There was a Bowhill East school opened in 1940 but now closed in the eastern part of what is now included in Bowhill. The dominant industries in the district are cereal grain and sheep farming.

The 2016 Australian census which was conducted in August 2016 reports that Bowhill had a population of 138 people.

See also
Lowan Conservation Park

References

Towns in South Australia